San Joaquin Street station, also known as Stockton – San Joaquin Street, is an Amtrak station in Stockton, California. Originally built for the Atchison, Topeka and Santa Fe Railway (which acquired the San Francisco and San Joaquin Valley Railroad), it is a stop for trains on Amtrak's San Joaquin line between Oakland and Bakersfield. The Mission Revival style building cost $24,470 to construct, and includes typical design features such as stuccoed walls, a red tile roof and shady arcades.

The San Joaquin Street station is one of two train stations in Stockton. San Joaquin trains running between Sacramento and Bakersfield, as well as Altamont Corridor Express (ACE) trains do not pass this station and instead use the Robert J. Cabral Station closer to downtown.

Two Amtrak Thruway bus routes serve this station. Route 3 connects passengers to the other station in Stockton, Sacramento, Chico and Redding. Route 6 connects with San Jose.

References

External links

Buildings and structures in Stockton, California
Amtrak stations in San Joaquin County, California
Former Atchison, Topeka and Santa Fe Railway stations in California
Railway stations in the United States opened in 1900
1900 establishments in California